Nino Da Silva (born May 26, 1979 in Santos, São Paulo) is a Brazilian former professional soccer player.  Currently runs an elite youth soccer club in the Northwest Suburbs of Chicago.

Early life 
Nino was born in Brazil to Nilton Da Silva, a former professional indoor soccer player.  Attended St. Viator Catholic High School in Arlington Heights, Illinois.  Was teammates with Walter Payton's son Jarrett Payton, Eric Peterson, and John Valentino at St. Viator. Led St. Viator to a 3rd place State finish his senior year.  A standout American high school soccer player, Nino was two-time National Player of the Year in 1996 and 1997.

Acting 
In 2005, Da Silva played the part of Eddie Souza in The Game of Their Lives, a movie about the U.S. victory over England in the 1950 FIFA World Cup.

Honors 
Youngest player at the time (17yrs. old) ever to sign a professional MLS contract.

Statistics

References

External links 
 Profile on MetroFanatic
 
 

1979 births
Living people
Sportspeople from Santos, São Paulo
Brazilian footballers
American soccer players
Brazilian emigrants to the United States
Association football forwards
Sporting Kansas City players
Orlando Sundogs players
MLS Pro-40 players
New York Red Bulls players
A-League (1995–2004) players
Major League Soccer players